Andrea Paluan (born 17 February 1966) is an Italian former professional racing cyclist. His finished 9th in the 11th stage of the 1997 edition of the Giro d'Italia, where he finished 42nd overall riding for Cantina Tollo.

References

1966 births
Living people
Italian male cyclists
Sportspeople from the Province of Biella
Cyclists from Piedmont